Juliet Campbell may refer to:

 Juliet Campbell (athlete) (born 1970), retired Jamaican sprinter
 Juliet Campbell (diplomat) (born 1935), retired British diplomat
 Juliet H. Lewis Campbell (1823–1898), American author

See also
Julia Campbell (disambiguation)
Julie Campbell (disambiguation)